Maximilien Branicki (born 16 December 1997) is a Belgian–French field hockey player.

Personal life
Maximilien Branicki has a younger brother, Stanislas, who also plays international hockey for France.

Career

Club level
In club competition, Branicki plays for Royal Orée in the Belgian Hockey League.

Belgium
Maximilien Branicki made his international debut at Under–18 level. He represented Belgium at the 2015 EuroHockey Youth Championship in Santander.

France
After competing at a junior level for Belgium, Branicki made the switch to his home country, France, in 2018. He made his debut for Les Bleus during a test series against Belgium in Brussels. Later that year he competed at the FIH World Cup in Bhubaneswar.

In 2019 he won his first medal with the French team, winning gold at the 2018–19 FIH Series Finals in Le Touquet.

Branicki was named in the French squad for the season three of the FIH Pro League.

References

External links
 
 

1997 births
Living people
French male field hockey players
Male field hockey defenders
Place of birth missing (living people)
2018 Men's Hockey World Cup players